GMC has both shared engine designs and architectures with other General Motors divisions as well as having a history of developing and using its own unique engines and powertrains such as for instance its line of their straight-6 and V8 engines.

GMC engines
GMC's own V8 was the  60 degree engine based on the big block  V6 (with two cylinders added). Bore was a massive 5.125” and stroke 3.86” for 637 cid. Power was listed as 275 HP @ 2800 rpm; torque 600 lbs.ft. @ 1600 rpm. Production started for 1967 and went through 1972.

Non-GMC engines

Pontiac
Prior to developing its own engines, smaller GMC's used the Pontiac V8 engine. They used the Pontiac  engine for 1955 and  engine in 1956, but advertised the engines as the "GMC 288" and "GMC 316". They used Pontiac's  in 1957. In Canada. (336.7).

Oldsmobile
Starting in 1955, for the larger trucks, the Oldsmobile Rocket V8 was available. Power listed for 1956 was 210 HP @ 4200 rpm; torque was 305 lbs.ft. @ 2400 rpm. For the 1957 through 1959 model years, it was upped in bore and stroke and called the 370. Power listed as 232 HP @ 4200 rpm and torque as 355 lbs.ft. @ 2600 rpm.
 Ref Motor’s Truck Repair Manuals various years.

Chevrolet Small-Block
From 1955 through 2003, GMC shared Chevrolet's small-block V8. This came in 265, 283, 305, 327, 350, and  (4.3, 4.6, 5.3, 5.7, and 6.6 L) sizes.

Chevrolet Big-Block
GMC also shared Chevrolet's big-block V8 from 1968 through 2007 The company used the 366, 396, 402, 427, 454, 496, and 502 (6.0, 6.5, 6.6, 7.0,7.4, 8.1, and 8.2 L) versions.

GM Corporate Gen-III & Gen-IV V8 Engines
Beginning in 1999, GMC began offering GM's third-generation "small-block" V8 engine in various models. Through the years, engines have been offered in 4.8, 5.3 and 6.0-liter displacements. Most of the LS- or LT-based truck engines feature cast-iron cylinder blocks and heads for improved durability.

Duramax engines
Beginning in 2001, GMC offered the same turbocharged diesel Duramax V8 engines as were available in similar Chevrolet trucks. The engine family was co-developed by GM Powertrain and Isuzu, and has gone through numerous iterations through the years. Duramax engines are paired with a heavy-duty automatic transmission from GM's Allison division.

See also
 Chevrolet small-block engine
 Chevrolet big-block engine
 LS based GM small-block engine
 Duramax V8 engine
 Buick V8 engine
 Cadillac V8 engine
 Oldsmobile V8 engine
 Pontiac V8 engine
 Holden V8 engine
 GMC straight-6 engine
 GMC V6 engine
 List of GM engines

References

V8
V8 engines